Talbotiella is a genus of flowering plants in the family Fabaceae. There are 9 species. Five are endemic to Cameroon.

Species:
Talbotiella bakossiensis
Talbotiella batesii
Talbotiella breteleri
Talbotiella cheekii
Talbotiella ebo
Talbotiella eketensis
Talbotiella gentii
Talbotiella korupensis
Talbotiella velutina

References

Detarioideae
Fabaceae genera
Taxonomy articles created by Polbot